Lachoudisch was a dialect of German, containing many Hebrew and Yiddish words, native to the Bavarian town of Schopfloch.
It was created in the sixteenth century. Few speakers remained after the Holocaust.

See also 
 Lotegorisch

References

 

German dialects
Judeo-Germanic languages
Jews and Judaism in Germany
Yiddish culture in Germany
Endangered languages of Europe